St. Augustine South is a census-designated place (CDP) in St. Johns County, Florida, United States. The population was 5,035 at the 2000 census.

Geography
St. Augustine South is located at  (29.843744, -81.314964).

According to the United States Census Bureau, the CDP has a total area of 1.7 square miles (4.5 km), all land.

Demographics

At the 2000 census there were 5,035 people, 1,929 households, and 1,462 families in the CDP. The racial makeup of the CDP was 96.80% White, 0.95% African American, 0.26% Native American, 1.11% Asian, 0.02% Pacific Islander, 0.14% from other races, and 0.71% from two or more races. Hispanic or Latino of any race were 2.82%.
Of the 1,929 households 31.9% had children under the age of 18 living with them, 63.6% were married couples living together, 8.8% had a female householder with no husband present, and 24.2% were non-families. 18.2% of households were one person and 8.4% were one person aged 65 or older. The average household size was 2.60 and the average family size was 2.95.

The age distribution was 24.0% under the age of 18, 6.3% from 18 to 24, 27.7% from 25 to 44, 26.3% from 45 to 64, and 15.7% 65 or older. The median age was 41 years. For every 100 females, there were 91.7 males. For every 100 females age 18 and over, there were 89.2 males.

The median household income was $52,090 and the median family income  was $56,592. Males had a median income of $36,123 versus $25,434 for females. The per capita income for the CDP was $21,883. About 2.3% of families and 4.1% of the population were below the poverty line, including 3.4% of those under age 18 and 2.9% of those age 65 or over.

Education
It is in the St. Johns County School District.

Zoned schools include Osceola Elementary School, R. J. Murray Middle School, and Pedro Menendez High School.

References

Census-designated places in St. Johns County, Florida
Census-designated places in the Jacksonville metropolitan area
Census-designated places in Florida
Populated places on the Intracoastal Waterway in Florida